CLS Holdings plc is a British commercial property investment business based in London, England. It is listed on the London Stock Exchange and is a constituent of the FTSE 250 Index.

History
The company was established by Sten Mörtstedt in 1987 and was first listed on the London Stock Exchange in 1994. The Company was one of the original three investors in The Shard development at London Bridge in 2006 but sold its interest for £30 million in January 2008.

Fredrik Widlund joined as CEO in November 2014, having previously been at GE Capital. In March 2016 Henry Klotz became Executive Chairman and Sten Mörtstedt became Executive Director. Historically, the Company made shareholder distributions by way of a tender offer buy-back, but announced in February 2017 the introduction of a dividend, and a proposed share sub-division.

The former executive director Sten Mörtstedt died in December 2020 at the age of 80.

Operations
One of the company's largest schemes is Vauxhall Square, a mixed-use scheme in the Vauxhall area of London. The company's property portfolio was valued at circa £2.3 billion as at 31 December 2022.

References

External links
Official site
 

Companies based in the London Borough of Lambeth
1987 establishments in England
Real estate companies established in 1987
Property companies of the United Kingdom
Companies listed on the London Stock Exchange